The 2007–08 First League of the Federation of Bosnia and Herzegovina season was the eighth since its establishment.

Clubs and stadiums

League standings

External links
 http://www.bihsoccer.com/?s=plfbih_sezona_2007-2008
soccerway.com; standings & results

First League of the Federation of Bosnia and Herzegovina seasons
2
Bos